You Tell Me may also refer to:
 "You Tell Me" (Paul McCartney song), 2007
 "You Tell Me" (Johnny Cash song), 1959
 You Tell Me (album), a 2019 album by David Brewis and Sarah Hayes
 "You Tell Me", a song by Terri Clark from the 2009 album The Long Way Home
 "You Tell Me", a song by Tom Petty and the Heartbreakers from the 1979 album Damn the Torpedoes